The Latvian Literary Society, also called The Society of Latvian Friends (Latviešu draugu biedrība) was founded in 1824 by Baltic Germans, mainly pastors. The goal of the Society was to investigate the Latvian language, folklore and culture. At the time, when the Society was organized, hardly any Latvian educated in a higher education existed, and nobody researched their language or folklore.

The organization was dissolved in 1941 by Soviet authorities after the occupation of Latvia.

Presidents

1824-1838: Gustav Reinhold von Kloth
1838-1845: Jacob Florentin Lundberg
1845-1851: Johann Theodor Berent
1851-1854: Karl Friedrich Jacob Hugenberger
1854-1864: Rudolf Schulz
1864-1895: August Johann Gottfried Bielenstein
1895-1903: Johannes Sakranowicz
1903-1919: Theodor Döbner
1925-1940: Jānis Zēvers

Members of Society in 1901

Honorary members
1. Bielenstein  August Pastor zu Doblen, Ehrenpresident
2. Auning  Robert Pastor zu Seßwegen 
3. Baron  Christian Oberlehrer emer. zu Riga, Suworowstr. 7
4. Bezzenberger  Adalbert Dr., Professor in Königsberg 
5. Döbner  Theodor Pastor zu Kalzenau 
6. Hausmann  R. Professor emer. in Jurjew (Dorpat)
7. Heerwagen  Ludwig Pastor emer. in Riga, Nicolaistr. 41 gest. 17 September 1899 
8. Heyking  v. Alfons Kurl. Landesbevollmächtigter a.D. gest. 22 March 1900 
9.  Hollman  Friedrich Livl. General-Superintendent, gest. 1 Septepber 1900 
10. Keyserling   Hugo Graf; Kurl. Landesbevollmächtigter 
11. Meyendorf v. Friedrich Landmarschall in Riga
12. Panck  Otto Kurl. General-Superintendent
13. Recke  v.d. Carl Gutsbesitzer zu Waldeck bei Mitau 
14. Uwarowa  Praskowja Gräfin; Präsidentin der Mosk. archäol. Gesellschaft

Ordinary Members and Corresponding Members
1. Allunan  Peter Privatier in Mitau, Seestr. 15 
2. Apsing Peter Stationsvorsteher in Segewold 
3.  Aron M. Journalist in Riga, Sprenkstr. 2. Q. 43 
4. Augstkalns  Verwalter, Smolensk 
5.  Awoht  Karl Pastor zu Laudohn 
6. Bahder v. Wilh. Aug. Pastor zu Neu-Autz 
7. Bankin  Martin Pastor zu Ust-Dwinsk 
8. Bährent Paul Pastor zu Arrasch 
9. Becker  Th. Pastor zu Frauenburg 
10. Behrsin  Peter Buchhändler in Riga 
11. Behrsin  Ludw. Cand. Oberlehrer in Kiew 
12. Behrsin  Robert Lehrer in Siuxt-Pönau 
13. Behting  Johann Musiklehrer in Irmlau 
14. Berg  Theodor Lehrer in Bickern 
15. Berg  Arwid Advokat in St. Petersburg 
16. Bergmann  Rudolf Pastor in Riga 
17. Bernewitz  Ernst Oberpastor in Riga 
18. Bernewitz  Alexander Pastor zu Kandau 
19. Bernewitz  Alexander Pastor zu Neuenburg 
20. Bernewitz  Fr. Pastor zu Wallhof 
21. Bernhard  J. Th. A. Pastor, CM 
22. Besthorn  Ferdinand Buchhändler in Mitau 
23. Beuningen  Friedrich Pastor zu Schrunden 
24. Bidder  O. Pastor zu Siekeln 
25. Bielenstein  Emil Pastor zu Sahten 
26. Bielenstein  Johannes Pastor zu Ringen 
27. Bielenstein  Walter Pastor zu Mesothen 
28. Bisseneek  J. Agronom in Mitau 
29. Block  Richard Küster in Sonnaxt 
30. Brasde J. Agronom in Paulsgnade 
31. Brasche  Heinrich Pastor zu Niederbartau
32. Braunschweig  Hermann Pastor zu Segewold 
33. Buchholz  Anton Privatier in Riga, gest. 3 October 1901 
34. Buddenbrock v. August Gutsb. in Kudling, bei Wenden 
35. Busch  Julius Pastor zu Nerft 
36. Busch  Woldemar Pastor zu Bauske 
37. Butuls  Ad. Dr. Riga. Kalkstraße 13 
38. Conradi  Moritz Pastor in Mitau 
39. Czarnay  Hugo Pastor zu Blieden 
40. Damberg  David Lehrer in Smilten 
41. Diederichs  Victor Lehrer, Alt-Rahden per Bauske 
42. Diston  Alexander Pastor emer. in Mitau 
43.  Duisburg  Arthur Pastor zu Birsen 
44. Ehrmann  Joh. Pastor zu Lasdohn 
45. Endzelin J. Oberlehrer in Jurjew (Dorpat) 
46. Erdmann  Oswald Pastor zu Bersohn 
47. Fedder  Georg Pastor zu Wenden 
48. Feldmann  Karl Pastor zu Setzen 
49. Feyerabend  Carl Pastor zu Dubena 
50. Freiberg  Ernst Pastor zu Ugahlen 
51. Freimann  C. Agronom in Mitau 
52. Funck  v. Theodor Gutsbesitzer zu Kaiwen. Gest. 8 August 1900 
53. Gähtgens  v. Theophil Propst in Riga 
54. Gavel  v. Hermann Pastor zu Neuhausen 
55. Girgensohn  Leonhard Pastor zu Lemsal 
56. Gläser  Karl Pastor zu Stenden 
57. Graudiņ  R. Redacteur in Mitau 
58. Grave  Friedrich Pastor zu Salisburg 
59. Grimm  Wilh. Pastor zu Rottelsdorf, Prowinz Sachsen, CM 
60. Groß Ernst Pastor zu Katlakaln 
61. Große  Julius Pastor adj. zu Alt-Rahden 
62. Grüner  Carl Pastor zu Roennen, Propst 
63. Grüner  Hermann Pastor zu Salgaln 
64. Grüner  Eduard Pastor zu Appricken 
65. Grünfeld  Johann Lehrer in Neuenburg 
66. Guleke  Rudolf Propst zu Alt-Pebalg, gest. 25 January 1901 
67. Häcker  Wilhelm Buchdruckereibesitzer in Riga 
68. Haffner  Paul Pastor zu Lemburg 
69. Heintze  Paul Pastor zu Dalbingen 
70. Hertel  Johann Dr. Mag. pharm., Apotheker in Mitau 
71. Hilde  Reinhold Pastor zu Struschan-Stirnian 
72. Hillner  Gotthilf Pastor zu Kokenhusen 
73. Hoerschelmann  Leo Buchhändler in Riga 
74. Hugenberger  Wilhelm Pastor zu Angermünde, gest. 10 December 1899 
75. Jeske  Adolf Pastor zu Schaulen 
76. Josephi  Herm. Pastor in Riga 
77. Irbe  Karl Pastor zu Serben 
78. Kade  Alexander Cand. in Rodenpois 
79. Kaehlbrandt  Johann Pastor zu Riga 
80. Kaehlbrandt  Emil Oberpastor zu Riga, Propst emer. 
81.  Kahlen  v. Heinrich Dr. phil. zu Geistershof 
82. Kaptein  Ernst Buchhändler in Riga 
83. Katterfeld  Ludwig Pastor in Mitau
84. Katterfeld  Adolf Dr. med., Arzt in Waldheim 
85. Kaudsit  Matthies Lehrer in Alt-Pebalg
86. Keller  Wilhelm Oberpastor in Riga 
87. Keller  R. Pastor in Riga 
88. Keußler  Gottlieb Pastor in St. Petersburg 
89. Klapmeyer  Heinrich Pastor zu Lesten 
90. Klausting  Christoph Organist in Grenzhof 
91. Klawiņ R. Hauslehrer u. Landswirth in Kokenhusen 
92. Krause  Richard Pastor zu Wonsees bei Kulmbach (Baiern) CM 
93. Kröger  Arthur Pastor zu Saucken 
94. Krüger  Carl Pastor zu Sessau 
95. Krüger  Eduard Dr. med. in Mitau 
96. Krüger  Leopold L.J. Pastor zu Wolmar 
97. Külpe  Ernst Pastor zu Libau 
98. Kundsiņ  Carl Pastor zu Smilten 
99. Lamberg  Theodor Pastor in Birsgal 
100. Landsberg  G. Buchdrucker in Mitau 
101. Lautenbach  Jacob Mag., Privatdozent der vergl. Sprachkunde in Jurjew 
102. Leepiņ  Lehrer in Neu-Autz 
103. Letz  Friedrich Pastor zu Subbath 
104. Lieven  Paul Dr. med. in Behnen 
105. Lieventhal  August Prof. in Riga. Gest. 18 May 1900 
106. Löwenthal  v. Friedrich Redacteur an der "Post" in Berlin. CM 
107.  Lohmeyer  Dr. Prof in Königsberg i. P. CM 
108. Lotto  Eugen Pfarrer zu Schwarzort (Ost-Preussen) 
109. Marnitz  Xaver Pastor zu Uexküll 
110. Maswersit  J. Agronom in Saratow 
111. Mekon  F. Literat in Sassenhof. Gest 3 June 1901 
112. Meyren  Johann Pastor in Riga 
113. Mierzynski  Anton Dr. Professor in Warschau. CM 
114.  Moltrecht  Carl Pastor emer. zu St. Mathiae 
115. Moltrecht  Emil Pastor in Talsen, Gest. 29 December 1898 
116. Mühlenbach  K. Oberlehrer in Riga 
117. Mühlenbach  Friedrich Oberlehrer in Mitau 
118. Mühlendorff  Wilhelm Pastor zu Muischazeem 
119. Müller  K. Schulvorsteher in Wenden 
120. Neander  Paul Pastor zu Mitau 
121.  Nehlep  Johannes Oberlehrer in Mitau 
122. Neuland  Johann Pastor zu Wolmar 
123. Ohse Jakob Professor in Jurjew (Dorpat) 
124. Otto  Gustav Dr. med., Kreisarzt in Mitau 
125. Pahrstrauts J. Pastor zu Gnadenfeld Gouvernement Saratow 
126. Peitan Woldemar Pastor zu Würzau 
127. Pelling  Paul Pastor zu Barbern 
128. Pelz David Gymnasialehrer in St. Petersburg 
129. Plates  Arnold Dr. phil. Buchdruckereibesitzer in Riga 
130. Plutte  W. Pastor adj. in Riga 
131. Pohrt  Eduard Pastor zu Rodenpois, Schulrath 
132. Pohrt  Gottlieb Pastor in Uetersen bei Hamburg. CM 
133. Radecki  v. Ottokar Riga 
134. Reinberg  Gustav Pastor zu St. Gertrud in Riga 
135. Reinberg  Adolf Buchdrucker in Riga
136. Reinhard  Johann Pastor zu Mitau 
137. Remmeck  M. Gymnasialinspektor in St. Petersburg 
138. Robs  Hans Kameralhofsbeamter in Mitau 
139. Ropp  v.d. Max Gutsbesitzer zu Bixten, Kreismarschall 
140. Rosen  G. Pastor adj. zu St. Petersburg 
141. Rosenberger  Robert Pastor zu Salwen 
142. Rottermund  K.N. Pastor in Riga 
143. Ruhdul  Joh. Kameralhofsbeamter in Mitau 
144. Rutkowski  Arnold Pastor zu Hofzumberge 
145. Sadowsky  Gustav Pastor zu Angern 
146. Sakranowicz  Johannes Pastor zu Groß-Autz 
147. Sanders  Johann Pastor in St. Petersburg 
148. Savary  Eberhard Pastor zu Ascheraden 
149. Schack-Steffenhagen  H. Buchdruckereibesitzer in Mitau 
150. Schalme  Jeannot Pastor zu Pilten 
151. Scheuermann  Eugen Pastor an der Lutherkirche zu Riga 
152. Schilling  Karl Pastor zu Nitau 
153. Schippang   Diakonus in Riga 
154. Schlau  Carl Dr. Pastor zu Salis, Propst 
155. Schmidt-Wartenberg v.  Prof. in Chicago. CM 
156. Schröder  Ernst Pastor emer. Riga. Kirchenstr. 3. 
157. Schröder  Robert Pastor zu Sissegal 
158. Schröder  v.  Leopold Dr., Professor in Innsbruck. CM 
159. Schulz  Rudolf Propst zu Eckau 
160. Schulz  Hermann Pastor zu Zeymel 
161. Schwanberg  Carl in Mitau 
162. Schwartz  Walter Pastor zu Allasch 
163. Seeberg  Georg Pastor zu Doblen 
164. Seewald  Peter Lehrer in Mitau 
165. Seesemann  Gustaw Pastor zu Grünhof 
166.  Seesemann  Heinrich Propst in Grenzhof 
167. Seesemann  Leonhard Pastor zu Kursiten 
168. Seiler  Herm. Pastor zu Wormen 
169. Seiler  Wilhelm Pastor zu Zohden 
170. Semmer E. Professor in St. Petersburg 
171. Siegmund  Karl Hausvater in Riga 
172. Sielmann  Theodor Oberlehrer, Landw. zu Welkenhof 
173. Sihle  Heinrich Agronom, Karlowa bei Dorpat 
174. Sihwert  Fr. Lehrer in Tels-Paddern 
175. Silin  Peter Lehrer in Riga 
176. Skribanowitz  Karl Pastor zu Cremon 
177. Skrusit  M Journalist in Riga 
178. Spalwing  Heinrich Redakteur in Riga 
179. Spalwing  August Pastor zu Lodiger 
180. Spriede  J. Gutsbesitzer, Groß-Bercken 
181. Steinfeld  Edmund Pastor zu Samiten 
182. Steinfeld  Wladimir Dr. med. in Alt-Autz 
183. Stender  Hans Pastor zu Sonnaxt
184. Stieda  Ludwig Dr. Professor zu Königsberg in Pr. CM
185. Straume  J. Journalist in Mitau 
186. Strautmann  Chr. Pastor in Bauske 
187. Strautsel  Paul Dr. med., Mitau 
188. Thielemann  Constantin Pastor adj. in Doblen 
189. Tittelbach  Werner Pastor zu Grösen 
190. Treu  Paul Pastor in Riga 
191. Tschakste  J. Rechtsanwalt in Mitau 
192. Ucke  Arnold Dr. auf Stirnen 
193. Vierhuff  Gotthard Pastor in Wenden 
194. Vogel  Richard Propst emer. in Friedrichstadt 
195. Walter  Karl Pastor in Riga 
196. Weide  Julius Pastor zu Grobin 
197. Weidemann  Theodor Organist in Siuxt 
198. Weidemann J. Redacteur in Mitau 
199. Welzer  Karl Pastor zu Egypten und Demmen 
200. Weyrich  Theodor Oberpastor in Riga 
201. Widberg   Buchhalter, Mitau 
202. Wilde  Pastor, z. Z. in Birkenruhe 
203. Wilpert  Karl Past. emer. zu Siuxt. Gest. 28 October 1901 
204. Wissendorff Henri Mitglied des Gelehrten Com. des Min. d. Volksaufklär. 
205. Wolter  Ed. Mag. Docent in St. Petersburg. CM 
206. Zimmermann  Ludwig Pastor zu Lennewarden, Propst 
207. Zubati  Professor Dr. Smechow in Böhmen. CM

References

External links
Roots-saknes.lv
LI.lv

Literary societies
Baltic-German people
Cultural history of Latvia